Penei Sewell (born October 9, 2000) is an American football offensive tackle for the Detroit Lions of the National Football League (NFL). He played college football at Oregon, where he won the Outland and Morris trophies in 2019. 

Sewell opted out of his junior season in 2020 due to the COVID-19 pandemic before being drafted seventh overall by the Lions in the 2021 NFL Draft. A native of American Samoa, he and his family moved to the continental United States in 2012, settling in Utah. He is the older brother of Noah Sewell.

Early life
Sewell was born on October 9, 2000, in Malaeimi, a village in American Samoa near the capital of Pago Pago. As a child, he would begin playing American football alongside his three brothers after his father Gabriel became a coach of the sport. Seeing the potential for his children to make it to the National Football League (NFL), Gabriel would move his family to St. George, Utah in 2012. There, Sewell attended and played football at Desert Hills High School. As a senior in 2018, he played in the US Army All-American and Polynesian Bowls before committing to the University of Oregon to play college football for the Oregon Ducks.

College career
Sewell became an immediate starter during his freshman year for the Ducks in 2018, starting seven games but missing six due to a high ankle sprain. He returned in 2019 and won the Morris Trophy and Outland Trophy. In addition, he and former Alabama quarterback Tua Tagovailoa were selected as co-recipients of the 2019 Polynesian College Football Player of the Year award. Sewell opted out of the 2020 season due to the COVID-19 pandemic and declared for the 2021 NFL Draft.

Professional career

Regarded as one of the best overall prospects in the 2021 NFL Draft, Sewell was selected seventh overall by the Detroit Lions. He tested positive for COVID-19 in May 2021 and had to sit out of minicamp. He signed his four-year rookie contract, worth $24.1 million, the same month. As a rookie, he appeared and started in 16 games, only being inactive for the regular season finale. He was named to the 2021 PFWA All-Rookie Team.

On December 21, 2022, Sewell was named an NFC Pro Bowl alternate. In Week 14 of the 2022 season, Sewell had a nine-yard reception late in the fourth quarter to give the Lions a crucial first down in the 34–23 victory over the Minnesota Vikings. In the 2022 season, he started in all 17 games.

Personal life
Sewell has three brothers: Gabriel, Nephi, and Noah. Gabriel is a linebacker for the Philadelphia Stars in the USFL, Nephi is a linebacker for the New Orleans Saints, and Noah is a linebacker for Oregon. The brothers are nephews of former NFL players Isaac Sopoaga and Richard Brown.

References

External links

Detroit Lions bio
Oregon Ducks bio

2000 births
Living people
People from St. George, Utah
People from Western District, American Samoa
Players of American football from Utah
Players of American football from American Samoa
American sportspeople of Samoan descent
American football offensive tackles
Oregon Ducks football players
All-American college football players
Detroit Lions players
National Conference Pro Bowl players